Buckeye Township is located in Stephenson County, Illinois. As of the 2010 census, its population was 1,359 and it contained 596 housing units. The communities of Cedarville, Red Oak, Buena Vista, Afolkey and Buckhorn Corners are located in the township.

Geography
Buckeye is Township 28 North, Ranges 7 (part) and 8 (part) East of the Fourth Principal Meridian.

Demographics

References

External links
City-data.com
Stephenson County Official Site

Townships in Stephenson County, Illinois
Townships in Illinois